The following heads of state and government formally suspended provisions of their state's constitution while in office.

Suspended in full

Suspended in part

See also
 Constitutionalism
 Constitutional economics
 Rule according to higher law
 Temporary Provisions against the Communist Rebellion

References

Constitutional law
Lists of office-holders
Lists of politicians